Eryx muelleri, known commonly as Müller's sand boa or the Saharan sand boa, is a species of snake in the family Boidae. The species is endemic to Africa.

Etymology
The specific name, muelleri, is in honor of Swiss herpetologist Fritz Müller.

Geographic range
E. muelleri is found in Benin, Burkina Faso, Cameroon, the Central African Republic, Chad, Gambia, Ghana, Guinea, the Ivory Coast, Mali, Mauritania, Niger, Nigeria, Senegal, Sudan, and Togo.

Reproduction
E. muelleri is oviparous.

Subspecies
Two subspecies are recognized as being valid, including the nominate subspecies.
Eryx muelleri muelleri 
Eryx muelleri subniger 

Nota bene: The trinomial authority in parentheses indicates that the subspecies was originally described in a genus other than Eryx.

References

Further reading
Angel F (1938). "Liste des reptiles du Mauritanie recueillis par la mission d'études de la biologie des Acridiens en 1936 et 1937. Description d'une sous-espèce nouvelle d Eryx muelleri". Bulletin du Muséum national d'histoire naturelle de Paris, Series 2, 10: 485–487. (Eryx muelleri subniger, new subspecies). (in French).
Boulenger GA (1892). "Description of a new Snake from Nubia". Annals and Magazine of Natural History, Sixth Series 9''': 74–76. (Gongylophis muelleri, new species).
Boulenger GA (1893). Catalogue of the Snakes in the British Museum (Natural History). Volume I., Containing the Families ... Boidæ ... London: Trustees of the British Museum (Natural History). (Taylor and Francis, printers). xiii + 448 pp. + Plates I-XXVIII. (Eryx muelleri'', new combination, p. 128 + Plate V, figure 2).

muelleri
Reptiles described in 1892
Taxa named by George Albert Boulenger